Vere was a British ship launched in 1774 as Fanny, and was renamed in 1781. She spent much of her career, under either name, as a West Indiaman. She was last listed in 1796.

Career
Vere first entered Lloyd's Register (LR) in 1781, with the notation that she had been Fanny. The entry for that year for Fanny had the annotation "Now the Vere, Carr".

Fanny
Fanny first appeared in LR in 1776.

Vere

Fate
Vere was last listed in 1796, though the last mention of Vere, Murray, master, in ship arrival and departure data occurred in 1792.

Citations

1774 ships
Age of Sail merchant ships of England